"Princess Pat" is a 1917 North American song, popular to sing at campfires. It began as a military cadence of Princess Patricia's Canadian Light Infantry.

Lyrics

The Real Princess Pat and her Colours
Princess Patricia, the Colonel-in-Chief, designed and made by hand the regimental colours of the Canadian Forces infantry regiment, named in her honour.
They are a crimson flag with a circular purple centre. In the circle are gold initials V P which stand for Victoria Patricia. The regimental colours became known as the "Ric-A-Dam-Doo", reportedly from the Gaelic for "cloth of your mother". This colour was carried in every regimental action during World War I.

The Ric-a-Dam-Doo
The original Ric-a-Dam-Doo is now in The Military Museums in Calgary.

References

1917 songs
Songs of World War I
Canada in World War I
Canadian folk songs
Songs about princesses
Cultural depictions of British women
Cultural depictions of the British Royal Family